Effected is the second studio album by American rapper Cozz. It was released on February 13, 2018, by  Dreamville Records, Interscope Records and Tha Committee Records. The album features guest appearances from J. Cole, Kendrick Lamar, Currensy and Garren. The album features production from a variety of record producers, including J. Cole, Meez, Cardiak, Elite, Ron Gilmore and Tae Beast, among others. Effected debuted at number 18 on the US Top Heatseekers chart and received generally positive reviews from critics.

Promotion
On January 5, 2018, Cozz released the lead single "Questions", accompanied by a music video on January 8. Cozz released three more songs prior to the album, "Badu" featuring Currensy on January 19, "Ignorant Confidence" on January 26, and "Bout It" featuring Garren on February 5. 
Cozz revealed the album's release date and tracklist on February 5, 2018.

Ahead of the album's release, Cozz released a 10-minute documentary titled, Cozz: Effected on February 12, 2018. A video for "Demons N Distractions" was released on March 1, 2018. On March 22, 2018, Cozz released the music video for "Bout It" featuring Garren. On April 4, 2018, Cozz announced The Effected Tour to further promote the album.

Critical reception

Upon its release, Effected received generally positive reviews by music critics. At Metacritic, which assigns a normalized rating out of 100 to reviews from mainstream critics, the album received an average score of 76, based on four reviews, which indicates "generally positive reviews". In a positive review for HipHopDX, Marcus Blackwell said: "Genre inconsistencies aside, Effected is a clear statement Cozz doesn’t just want to be the conversation with the best rappers. He wants to steer the debates." Writing for Exclaim!, Lidia Abraha commented saying, "Effected deserves props for its altruistic insight on the ups-and-downs of being an artist, and for Cozz's nuanced storytelling. There's room for improvement for the melodies and beats, even though the subtle instrumentals help amplify Cozz's voice and his champion storytelling." In Pitchforks review of Effected, Jackson Howard writes Effected "is a confident step toward turning what used to be fantasy into cold, hard reality."

Respect. praised the album saying: "From beginning to end, Cozz expresses different relatable situations throughout manhood. Rather than speaking on matters of the heart, Cozz’ blunt attitude and straight forward sense of thinking gives off the perception of a player. Being one of the main artists on Dreamville‘s forefront, Cozz is sure to fill in the necessary gaps to land his solidified spot in the game." 2DOPEBOYZ called Cozz a "very talented rapper that is destined for a good spot in the rap game." They continued saying, "Adding more versatility into his formula for ultimate success could help gain the respect he strives to attain." XXL magazine praised Cozz' growth as a songwriter, they commented saying, "There's no denying that Cozz can rap his ass off—that much was confirmed after one play-through of his 2014 debut. Effected, however, confirms that Cozz has more in him than just straight bars. He continues to tell his own story but through new flows, different hooks and an advanced way of making rap songs."

Track listing
Credits adapted from Tidal.Notes  signifies a co-producer
  signifies an additional producer
  signifies an uncredited co-producerSample credits "Hustla's Story" contains a sample from "Happy Feelings" performed by Maze, and written by Frankie Beverly.
 "Demons N Distractions" contains a sample from "Simple Life" written and performed by Peter Milray.
 "Freaky 45" contains a sample from "Love On A Rainy Afternoon" performed by Arif Mardin.
"Proof" contains a sample from "Untitled" from the Private US Library 1976.
 "Badu" contains a sample from "Soft Shell" written by Steve Kennedy and William Smith and performed by Motherlode.
 "My Love" contains a sample from "To Kill A Mockingbird (Main Title)" performed by Elmer Bernstein.
 "That's The Thing" contains a sample from "Fallin' In Love", written by Ann Hamilton and Dan Hamilton, as performed by Hamilton, Joe Frank & Reynolds.
 "Zendaya" contains elements from "Abre Alas" performed by Ivan Lins.
 "Not a Minute More" contains a sample from "Lines", written by Sam Evans, Roxane Barker, Jacob Welsh, David Turay, Matt Knox and Geordan Reid-Campbell, as performed by The Hics.

Personnel
Credits adapted from Tidal.Performance Cozz – primary artist
 Kendrick Lamar – featured artist 
 Currensy – featured artist 
 Garren – featured artist 
 J. Cole – featured artist Production'
 Rob Kinelski – mixer 
 Soul Professa – producer 
 Hollywood JB – producer 
 Meez – additional producer , producer 
 Louie Ji – additional producer , producer , uncredited co-producer 
 Chef Mitchell - uncredited co-producer , additional producer 
 Mike Almighty - uncredited co-producer , additional producer 
 Cardiak – producer 
 Beat Butcha – additional producer 
 Dontae Winslow – additional producer 
 Uncle Dave – additional producer 
 Anthony Ware – additional producer 
 Ron Gilmore – additional producer 
 D-Low Beats – producer 
 Enimal – producer 
 Tae Beast – producer 
 DJ Wes – additional producer 
 J. Cole – producer

Charts

References

2018 albums
Interscope Records albums
Dreamville Records albums
Albums produced by J. Cole
Albums produced by Beat Butcha
Albums produced by Tae Beast